Falnama is a book of omens used by fortune tellers in Iran, India and Turkey during the 16th and 17th centuries. Individuals seeking insight into the future would engage in a series of purification rituals, turn to a random page in the Falnama, and interpret the text and drawings thereon for good or ill. Falnama manuscripts were primarily created during the 16th and 17th centuries as the Islamic calendar was approaching the year 1000.

The Dispersed Falnama was an illustrated Falnama that was commissioned by Shah Tahmasp in mid-1550s-early-1560s. Many of the paintings involve Ali, who was considered the first Shi'i Imam and central to the Safavid Empire's state ideology. In the "Coffin of Imam 'Ali" painting, Ali is depicted with a flaming halo which was a technique of the preexisting Zoroastrian art in Iran.

External links 
 
 Falnama: Book of Omens

References 

16th-century books
17th-century books
Early Modern literature
Divination
Turkish books
Persian literature